Sally Clark (1964–2007) was an English victim of a miscarriage of justice who was falsely convicted and imprisoned for the murder of her two infant sons.

Sally Clark may also refer to:
Sally Clark (playwright) (born 1953), Canadian playwright and filmmaker
Sally J. Clark, Seattle City Council member
Sally Clark (equestrian) (born 1958), New Zealand equestrian